is a train station on the Osaka Metro Nagahori Tsurumi-ryokuchi Line in Chūō-ku, Osaka, Japan.  Matsuyamachi is often called "Matchamachi" (まっちゃまち)and known as ton'yas (wholesale) selling Japanese dolls (ningyo), penny sweets (dagashi), toys (omocha) and fireworks (hanabi).

Layout
This station has an island platform with 2 tracks, and is fenced with platform gates.

Chūō-ku, Osaka
Osaka Metro stations
Railway stations in Japan opened in 1996